Tselinny District may refer to:
Tselinny District, Russia, name of several districts in Russia
Tselinny District, name of Gabit Musirepov District in North Kazakhstan Province, Kazakhstan, until 2002